Luis Carlos "Coroncoro" Perea (born 29 December 1963) is a Colombian former professional footballer who played as a central defender.

Club career
Perea was born in Turbo. During his career he played mainly with Independiente Medellín, where he would debut in 1983, and Atlético Nacional, but also had brief spells with Atlético Junior and Deportes Tolima. 

Abroad, Perea represented Toros Neza in Mexico, and he won the 1989 Copa Libertadores with Nacional. He moved to the United States in 1999, intending to sign with the Miami Fusion or Tampa Bay Mutiny; he did not join either club and retired from playing, but began working as a player development coach at the Miami Strike Force.

International career
Over seven years, Perea played 78 games and scored two goals for the Colombia national team. This included six appearances at the 1990 and the 1994 FIFA World Cups combined.

Perea participated in four Copa América finals, and netted his first international goal in the 1993 Copa América, in the 88th minute of the quarter-final match against Uruguay (1–1 after 120 minutes, penalty shootout win).

International goals
Scores and results list Colombia's goal tally first, score column indicates score after each Perea goal.

Personal life
Perea was named in a list of the top 100 prominent Latinos living in Miami. His son, Luis Alberto, was also a footballer. A forward, he played for a host of clubs in several countries.

References

External links

1963 births
Living people
Sportspeople from Antioquia Department
Colombian people of African descent
Colombian footballers
Association football defenders
Categoría Primera A players
Independiente Medellín footballers
Atlético Nacional footballers
Atlético Junior footballers
Deportes Tolima footballers
Liga MX players
Toros Neza footballers
Colombia international footballers
1990 FIFA World Cup players
1994 FIFA World Cup players
1987 Copa América players
1989 Copa América players
1991 Copa América players
1993 Copa América players
Colombian expatriate footballers
Colombian expatriate sportspeople in Mexico
Expatriate footballers in Mexico
Colombian expatriate sportspeople in the United States
Expatriate soccer players in the United States